Tell Hadidi, ancient Azu, is an ancient Near East archaeological site in Syria about 30 kilometers north of Emar and 5 kilometers north of Ekalte. It lies on the west bank of the Euphrates River on the opposite bank from  Tell es-Sweyhat. It is thought to be a paired city with Tell es-Sweyhat controlling a Euphrates river crossing. There are prominent hollow ways between the site and Tell es-Sweyhat, Tell Othman, and Tell Jouweif. The site was occupied from the Early Bronze Age period to the Late Bronze Age and again to a lesser extent in Roman times. It was one of several rescue excavations sparked by the construction of the Tabqa Dam and the resulting Lake Assad. The town's primary god was Dagan.

Archaeology
The site of Tell Hadidi has an extent of around 135 hectares. It has an upper and lower tell. The upper tell, lying to the west and with an area of around 55 hectares, has Middle Bronze Age remains on the surface with Early Bronze Age underneath. The lower tell, lying to the east, is primarily Early Bronze Age, in the late 3rd Millennium BC, and was at least partially protected by a fortification wall at that time. Looted out haft and chamber graves from this period were found there. Some remains from the Late Bronze Age were also found there including an undisturbed tomb. It was 12 meters long and contained 6 chambers.

Tell Hadidi was visited by Abdul Rihaoui in 1963 and Maurits van Loon in 1964 as part of preparation for the dam rescue efforts.

The site was excavated in between 1973 and 1977. In 1972-74 Tell Hadidi was worked by Henk Frankel for Leiden University of the Netherlands.  From 1974 to 1977 Rudolph H. Dornemann excavated there under the auspices of the Milwaukee Public Museum. Some of those excavation reports are still unpublished. Along with a few cuneiform tablets a number of small finds were recovered including about 200 Early Bronze clay figurines, an inscribed stone plaque, and a toy chariot front.

History
The site was first occupied at the beginning of the Early Bronze Age EB I (circa 3300 BC) about the Uruk Period. There are nine EB I architectural levels. The city developed to its maximum extent of about 135 hectares in the later part of the Early Bronze Age EB III (circa 2300 BC) and was destroyed around 2000 BC. Occupation continued, on a much reduced scale and only on the upper tell, into the Late Bronze Age (IA and IB), ending circa 1200 BC. There are also significant Roman Empire remains, circa 1st to 3rd century, and some Islamic remains, circa 12th to 14th century. For a time in the Late Bronze Age, circa 1500 BC, the city was under the control of the Mitanni Empire. It may have also been under the control of the Hittite Empire at one point.

Tablets
The most significant element discovered was a 15th century BC (Late Bronze Age) building ("Tablet Building" in Area H, Stratum 6) that was violently destroyed by fire. In it were found a few cuneiform tablets. Along with them were a number of large storage jars, vats, cups, jars, and cooking pots. The tablets identified the building as the residence of "Yaya, son of Huziru, son of Dagan" and the cities name as Azu (otherwise known only from records of the city of Alalakh). There were eleven complete cuneiform tablets (eight found in a jar), three almost complete tablets, and three tablet fragments. They are held in the National Museum of Aleppo in Syria.

The Tell Hadidi text are primarily of a legal nature and include five sale documents, three administrative lists of names, two legal documents, a letter, and a will (Had-9) of Yaya the owner of the home. Four of the individuals listed in the tablets are also known from tablets recovered at Ekalte. The most common divine name used is that of Dagan, followed by various forms of the Storm God including Tessup the Hurian version. The tablets have not been formally published but Robert Whiting of the Oriental Institute of Chicago made preliminary transcriptions and translations available online. One tablet (Had-9), and official Mitanni leter order, is significant because it set a chronology synchronism between Azu, Ekalte, and Emar.

See also
Cities of the ancient Near East

References

Further reading
 J. E. Boor, "Pots to People: The Tell Hadidi Area C Ceramics at the Milwaukee Public Museum", Ph.D. Thesis. The University of Wisconsin - Milwaukee, 2012
 A. T. Clason  and H. Buitenhuis, "A Preliminary Report on the Faunal Remains of Nahr el Homr, Hadidi and Ta’as in the Tabqa Dam Region in Syria", In Journal of Archaeological Science No. 5, pp. 75–83, 1978
 Rudolph H. Dornemann, "The Syrian Euphrates Valley as a Bronze Age Cultural Unit, Seen from the Point of View of Mari and Tell Hadidi.", Deir ez-Zur, pp. 63–73, 1983
 Rudolph H. Dornemann, "Tell Hadidi.", Archiv für Orientforschung 28:, pp. 218–223, 1981/82
 Rudolph H. Dornemann, "Early Second Millennium Ceramic Parallels between Tell Hadidi-Azu and Mari.", In Mari in Retrospect: Fifty Years of Mari and Mari Studies, edited by Gordon D. Young, pp. 77–112. Winona Lake: Eisenbrauns, 1992
 Rudolph H. Dornemann, "Tell Hadidi: Looking Back", Lore 35(1), pp. 16–23, 1985
 H. J. Franken, "Pottery from a Middle Bronze Age Tomb near Tell Hadidi on the Euphrates.", In Archaeology in the Levant: Essays for Kathleen Kenyon, edited by Peter Roger Stuart Moorey and Peter Parr, pp. 67–75. Warminster: Aris and Phillips, 1978"
 Jamie Henry "The Orphaned Archaeological Collections and its Place in the Modern Museum: A Case Study from Tell Hadidi, Syria.", Presented at The 81st Annual Meeting of the Society for American Archaeology, Orlando, Florida. 2016
 Robert B. Mason and Lisa Cooper. "Petrographic analysis of Bronze Age pottery from Tell Hadidi, Syria.", Levant 31.1, pp. 135–147, 1999
 J. A. McClellan, "The Analysis of Metal Artifacts from Tell Hadidi in North Syria.", Masca Journal 2(4), pp. 114–119, 1983
 R. Miller, "Flintknapping and Arrowhead Manufacture at Tell Hadidi, Syria", Milwaukee Public Museum, Milwaukee, 1985
 R. Miller, "Chisel-ended arrowheads from Tell Hadidi", Syria. Bulletin of the Institute of. Archaeology, 20, pp. 187–190. London University Institute of Archaeology, 1983
 Gerrit van der Kooij, "Some Ethnographical Observations of Archaeological Impact at the Village Hadidi in Syria.", Lettres d’Information Archéologie Orientale 5, pp. 80 – 84, 1992

External links
 Selections from the Tell Hadidi Collection - Milwaukee Public Museum

Archaeological sites in Syria